This article contains a listing of notable French royal mistresses.

Chlothar I
 Waldrada, Princess of the Lombards 
 Valtrude of the Lombards
 Arnegundis

Charibert I
 Merofleda
 Clothilde 
 Marcovefa
 Theogilda

Chilperic I
 Fredgunde d'Ardennes (d. 597), mistress, then wife

Dagobert I
 Regintrude of Austrasia 
 Berthilde

Charlemagne
 Gersuinda of the Saxons
 Amaltrud of Vienne
 Ethelind
 Sigrade
 Madelgard
 Regina
 Landrade des Herbages 
 Adelindus

Louis the Pious
 Theodelinde of Sens

Louis the Stammerer
 Luitgrade of Saxony
 Adelheid of Paris

Charles the Simple
 Edgiva of Kent
 Frederuna von Ringleheim

Philip I
 Bertrade de Montfort ( 1070 – c. 1116): marriage not recognised by the Church

Louis VI
 Marie de Breuillet

Louis X
 Unknown woman, with whom he had a daughter, Eudeline.

Philip VI
 Béatrice de la Berruère (1294–1348)

Charles V
 Biette de Cassinel (c. 1340 – c. 1380){{efn|"..concerning the relations which may have existed between Charles V and the mother[Biette Cassinel] of Jean de Montaigu, are not justified by any proof by any reference.."}}
 Unknown, mother of Oudard d'Attainville (1360 – ?).

Charles VI
 Odette de Champdivers (c. 1384 – 1424)

Charles VII
 Agnès Sorel (c. 1422 – 1450)
 Antoinette de Maignelais (c. 1430 – c. 1461)

Louis XI
 Félize Régnard (c. 1425 – 1475)
 Marguerite de Sassenage (c. 1424 – 1471)

Francis I

Official mistresses (maîtresse-en-titre)
 Françoise de Foix (1495–1537), countess of Châteaubriant
 Anne de Pisseleu d'Heilly (1508–1580), duchess of Étampes
Unofficial mistresses (petite maîtresse)

 Marie Gaudin (1490 or 1495–1580), dame de La Bourdaisière, she was the ancestor of Gabrielle d'Estrées
 Mary Boleyn (1499–1543) (disputed)'', eldest sister of Anne Boleyn and of George Boleyn, later mistress of Henry VIII of England
 La Belle Ferronnière
 Claude de Rohan-Gyé (1519–1579), countess of Tonnerre and of Thoury
 La Châtelaine de Montfrault

Henry II

Official mistresses (maîtresse-en-titre)
 Diane de Poitiers (1499–1566)

Unofficial mistresses (petite maîtresse)

 Jane Fleming (or Jane Stewart) (c. 1508 – c. 1553) 
 Filippa Duci (c. 1520 –?) 
 Nicole de Savigny (1535–1590), baroness of Fontette

Charles IX

Unofficial mistresses (petite maîtresse)
 Marie Touchet (c. 1553 – 1638)

Henry III

Unofficial mistresses (petite maîtresse)
 Louise de La Béraudière du Rouhet
 Renée de Rieux de Châteauneuf 
 Veronica Franco (1546–1591)
 Marie of Cleves, Princess of Condé
 Jeanne de Laval, dame de Senneterre (1549–1586)
 Françoise Babou de La Bourdaisière, mother of Gabrielle d'Estrées

Henry IV

This list includes historically recognised and popularly attributed mistresses:

Official mistresses (maîtresse-en-titre)

 Gabrielle d'Estrées (c. 1571–1599), mistress 1591–1599
 Catherine Henriette de Balzac d'Entragues (1579–1633), marquise of Verneuil, mistress 1599–1609

Unofficial mistresses (petite maîtresse)

 Fleurette de Nérac, vers 1571–1572, fille d’un jardinier de Nérac 
 Charlotte de Sauve (c. 1551–1617), mistress in 1572.
 Bretine de Duras, mistress 1573–1574
 Louise de la Béraudière, called « La belle Rouet », mistress in 1575, maid of honour of Queen Margaret 
 Louise Borré, mistress 1575–1576, daughter of a royal notary. She gave him a son, Hervé (1576–1643) 
 Jeanne de Tignonville, mistress 1577–1578
 Victoire de Ayala, mistress in 1578, maid of honour of Catherine de' Medici
 Mlle Rebours, mistress in 1579, maid of honour of Queen Margaret 
 Mlle de Montagu, mistress in 1579 
 Mme d’Allous, mistress in 1579
 Aimée Le Grand, mistress in 1579
 Arnaudine, mistress in 1579
 La garce de Goliath », mistress in 1579
 Catherine de Luc, mistress in 1579. She died of hunger when Henry abandoned her, leaving behind their child.
 Anne de Cambefort,  mistress in 1579. She committed suicide by jumping out of a window after Henry left her
 Françoise de Montmorency (1566–6 December 1641), mistress 1579–1581, maid of honour of Queen Margaret. She had one stillborn daughter with the king in 1581.
 Diane d'Andouins, called « la belle Corisande » (c. 1554 – c. 1584)
 Esther Imbert (or Ysambert), mistress 1587–1588. She had two sons with Henry.
 Martine, rochelaise, en 1587. She had one child with Henry.
 Antoinette de Pons (1570–1632), marquess of Guercheville
 Catherine de Verdun
 Mme Quelin, mistress in 1598
 Isabelle Potier, mistress 1598–1599
 Mlle Clein, mistress in 1599
 La Glandée, mistress in 1599
 Marie-Françoise de La Bourdaisière, sister of Gabrielle d’Estrées, mistress in 1599
 Jacqueline de Bueil (c. 1580–1651) 
 Charlotte des Essarts  (c. 1580–1651), mistress 1607–1609
 Marie-Charlotte de Balzac d’Entragues, mistress 1605–1609
 Angélique Paulet, mistress in 1610

Louis XIV

Official mistresses (maîtresse-en-titre)

 1661–1667: Louise de La Vallière (1644–1710), duchess of Vaujours 
 1667–1681: Françoise-Athénaïs de Rochechouart de Mortemart (1640–1707), marquise of Montespan
 1678–1681: Marie Angélique de Scoraille de Roussille (1661–1681), duchess of Fontanges
 1683–1715: Françoise d'Aubigné (1635–1719), marquise of Maintenon. Not really a mistress but a secret morganatic wife

Unofficial mistresses (petite maîtresse)

 Catherine Bellier (1614–1689) baroness of Beauvais, between 1652–1654
 Olympe Mancini (1638–1708) in 1654–1657 and 1660-1661
 
 Anne-Madeleine de Conty d'Argencourt in 1658
 Marie Mancini (1639–1715) in 1658–1659; not a mistress but a platonic love
 Name unknown: a gardener's daughter who gave birth to a daughter in 1660
 Henrietta Anne of England (1644–1670) his sister-in-law, probably platonic, in 1660–1661
 
 Bonne de Pons d'Heudicourt (1641–1709) in 1665
 Catherine-Charlotte de Gramont (1639–1678) princess of Monaco in 1665
 Gabrielle de Rochechouart de Mortemart (1633–1693), marquise of Thianges; sister of madame de Montespan
 Anne de Rohan-Chabot (1648–1709), princess of Soubise, on-and-off in 1669–1675
 Claude de Vin des Œillets (c. 1637 – 1687) in 1670–1676 
 Diane-Gabrielle de Damas de Thianges (1656-1715) in 1670–1673; daughter of madame de Thianges and niece of madame de Montespan
 Lydie de Rochefort-Théobon (1638-1708) in 1673–1677
 Isabelle de Ludres (1647–1722) in 1675–1678 
  Marie-Charlotte de Castelnau, comtesse de Louvigny et duchesse de Gramont (c. 1648 – 1694) in 1676–1677
 Marie-Madeleine Agnès de Gontaut Biron, marquise de Nogaret (1653–1724) in 1680–1683
 Louise-Elisabeth Rouxel dite Mme de Grancey (1653–1711) in 1681
 Jeanne de Rouvroy, marquise de Chevrières (1650–1689) in 1681
 Françoise Thérèse de Voyer de Dorée, Mlle d’Oré, in 1681
 Marie-Antoinette de Rouvroy, comtesse d’Oisy (1660–1721) in 1681
 Marie-Rosalie de Piennes, future marquise de Châtillon (1665–1735) in 1681
 Mme de Saint-Martin in 1682
 Marie-Louise de Montmorency-Laval, duchesse de Roquelaure (1657–1735) in 1683
  Julie de Guenami, dite Mlle de Châteaubriant (1668–1710) in 1683 (possibly only a rumour)

Louis XV

Official mistresses (maîtresse-en-titre)

 1732–1742: Louise Julie de Mailly
 1739–1741: Pauline-Félicité de Mailly
 1742–1745: Diane-Adélaïde de Mailly
 1742–1744: Marie-Anne de Mailly
 1745–1764: Jeanne Antoinette Poisson
 1769–1774: Jeanne Bécu

Unofficial mistresses (petite maîtresse)
After 1755, unofficial lovers of the king which did not belong to the nobility were often kept at the Parc-aux-Cerfs.

 1738: NN, a butcher's daughter in Versailles
 1738: Thérèse-Eulalie de Beaupoil de Saint-Aulaire (1705–1739), marquise de Beuvron
 1738: Marie-Anne de Vougny (1716–1783) Madame Amelot
 1748: Anne-Marie de Montmorency-Luxembourg (1729–1760), princesse de Robecq.
 1748: Marie-Anne-Françoise de Noailles, comtesse de La Marck (1719–1793).
 1749: Elisabeth-Charlotte Huguet de Sémonville (1715–1784), comtesse d'Estrades.
 1749: Marie-Françoise de Carbonnel de Canisy (1725–1796), marquise d’Antin puis comtesse de Forcalquier.
 1750: Alexandrine Sublet d'Heudicourt, (1721–1800) marquise de Belsunce.
 1750: Françoise de Chalus, duchesse de Narbonne-Lara, première femme de chambre de la duchesse de Parme (1734–1821).
 1750–1750: Irène du Buisson de Longpré (d. 1767) 
 1750–1751: Marie Geneviève Radix de Sainte-Foy (1729–1809)
 1752: Mlle Trusson, femme de chambre de la dauphine Marie-Josèphe de Saxe.
 1752: Jeanne-Marguerite de Niquet (fl. 1732–1795) dite Mlle de Niquet. 
 1752: Mlle de Saint-André
 1752–1755: Thérèse Guerbois 
 1752–1752: Charlotte Rosalie de Choiseul-Beaupré (1733–1753) 
 1752–1754: Marie-Louise O'Murphy (1737–1815) 
 1755–1755: Françoise de Chalus (1734–1821), duchess of Narbonne-Lara 
 1755–1757: Brigitte O'Murphy (1729–1793)
 1755: Mlle Fouquet, daughter of a hairdresser
 1755: Mlle Robert
 1755–1759: Mlle David
 1755–1759: Mlle Armory, « Mimi», daughter of a ballet dancer 
 1756: Gabrielle-Charlotte Françoise d‘Hénin-Liétard (1729–1809), vicomtesse de Cambis, née princesse de Chimay
 1756: Dorothée, daughter of a water carrier in Strasbourg.
 1756: Mlle Selin
 1757–1757: Marie Anne de Coislin (1732–1817)
 1758: Marie-Louise de Marny (fl. 1737 – fl. 1793), Madame de Giambone
 1759: Marie-Madeleine Couppier de Romans, Madame Varnier
 1759–1762: Marguerite-Catherine Haynault (1736–1823), marquise of Montmelas
 1760–1763: Lucie Madeleine d'Estaing (1743–1826) 
 1760–1765: Anne Couppier de Romans (1737–1808), baroness of Meilly-Coulonge 
 1762–1765: Louise-Jeanne Tiercelin de La Colleterie (1746–1779), called Madame de Bonneval
 1763–1765: Anne Thoinard de Jouy (1739–1825)
 1763: Marie-Françoise-Marguerite de Talleyrand-Périgord (1727–1775), comtesse de Périgord
 1764: Béatrix de Choiseul-Stainville, duchesse de Gramont (1730–1794)
 1764: Louise Jeanne Marie de Courtarvel de Pezé (1733–1789), marquise de Dreux-Brézé
 1763–1765: Anne Thoynard de Jouy, comtesse d’Esparbès de Lussan (1739–1825)
 1765: Marie-Adélaïde de Bullioud (1743–1793), comtesse de Séran
 1768–1768: Catherine Éléonore Bénard (1740–1769) 
 1768–1768: Marie Thérèse Françoise Boisselet (1731–1800)
 1768: Jeanne-Marguerite Salvetat (1748–1838), actress
 1771: "demoiselle de Smith"
 1771: Madame Bèche, wife of a musician of the royal chapel
 1771: Françoise-Marie-Antoinette de Saucerotte (1756–1815), Mademoiselle Raucourt, actress
 1772: Madame d’Amerval
 1773: Rose-Marie-Hélène de Tournon (1757–1582), vicomtesse du Barry
 1774–1774: Albertine-Elisabeth Pater (1742–1817)
 Date unknown: Marthe-Antoinette Aubry de Vatan (1720 – after 1777)
 Date unknown:  Mme de Grandis, Mme de Martinville, Mlle de Ville, courtesan
 Date unknown:  Mme de Beaunier, Mlle de Malignan, Mme de Salis

Napoleon I
 1806–1808: Eléonore Denuelle
 1809–1810: Marie Walewska

Louis XVIII

Official mistresses (maîtresse-en-titre)

 Zoé Victoire Talon, comtesse du Cayla

Unofficial mistresses (petite maîtresse)

 1780–1791: Anne Jacobée Nompar

Charles X
 Rosalie Duthé; equally mistress of Philippe Égalité
 Louise d'Esparbès de Lussan
 Aglaé de Polignac

Napoleon III
 1856–1857: Virginia Oldoini, Countess of Castiglione 
 1857–1861: Marie-Anne Walewska
 1863–1870: Marguerite Bellanger

See also
 Maîtresse-en-titre

Notes

References

Sources

External links
 Liste des maîtresses du Roi-Soleil (French)

French royal mistresses
 
Royal Mistresses